Dipterocarpus humeratus is a species of tree in the family Dipterocarpaceae. The species name humeratus is derived from Latin ( = shoulder) and refers to the articulated petiole. D. humeratus is an emergent tree, up to 50 m tall, found in mixed dipterocarp forests on well-drained clay soils. The species is found scattered or semi-gregarious on undulating land and clay ridges below 700 m altitude. It is found in Sumatra and Borneo (Brunei, Sabah, Sarawak and Kalimantan) and occurs in at least three protected areas (Sepilok Forest Reserve, Ulu Temburong and Gunung Mulu National Parks).

References

humeratus
Trees of Sumatra
Trees of Borneo